Frassinelle Polesine is a comune (municipality) in the Province of Rovigo in the Italian region Veneto, located about  southwest of Venice and about  southwest of Rovigo.

The municipality of Frassinelle Polesine contains the frazioni (subdivisions, mainly villages and hamlets) Caporumiatti, Casotti, Chiesa, Crociara, Le Cornere, Passo di Villamarzana, and Viezze.

Frassinelle Polesine borders the following municipalities: Arquà Polesine, Canaro, Fiesso Umbertiano, Pincara, Polesella, Villamarzana.

Demographic evolution

References

Cities and towns in Veneto